Robert Kane (born Robert Kahn ; October 24, 1915 – November 3, 1998) was an American comic book writer, animator and artist who co-created Batman (with Bill Finger) and most early related characters for DC comics. He was inducted into the comic book industry's Jack Kirby Hall of Fame in 1993 and into the Will Eisner Comic Book Hall of Fame in 1996.

Early life and work
Robert Kahn was born in New York City, New York. His parents, Augusta and Herman Kahn, an engraver, were of Ashkenazi Jewish descent. A high school friend of fellow cartoonist and future Spirit creator Will Eisner, Robert Kahn graduated from DeWitt Clinton High School and then legally changed his name to Robert Kane. He studied art at Cooper Union before "joining the Max Fleischer Studio as a trainee animator in the year of 1934".

Comics
He entered the comics field two years later, in 1936, freelancing original material to editor Jerry Iger's comic book Wow, What a Magazine!, including his first pencil and ink work on the serial Hiram Hick. The following year, Kane began to work at Iger's subsequent studio, Eisner & Iger, which was one of the first comic book "packagers" that produced comics on demand for publishers entering the new medium during its late-1930s and 1940s Golden Age. Among his work there was the talking animal feature "Peter Pupp"—which belied its look with overtones of "mystery and menace"—published in the U.K. comic magazine Wags and reprinted in Fiction House's Jumbo Comics. Kane also produced work through Eisner & Iger for two of the companies that would later merge to form DC Comics, including the humor features "Ginger Snap" in More Fun Comics, "Oscar the Gumshoe" for Detective Comics, and "Professor Doolittle" for Adventure Comics. For that last title he went on to do his first adventure strip, "Rusty and his Pals".

Batman

In early 1939, DC's success with the seminal superhero Superman in Action Comics prompted editors to scramble for more such heroes. In response, Bob Kane conceived "the Bat-Man." Kane said his influences for the character included actor Douglas Fairbanks' film portrayal of the swashbuckler Zorro; Leonardo da Vinci's diagram of the ornithopter, a flying machine with huge bat-like wings; and the 1930 film The Bat Whispers, based on Mary Rinehart's mystery novel The Circular Staircase (1908).
Bill Finger joined Bob Kane's nascent studio in 1938. An aspiring writer and part-time shoe salesperson, he had met Kane at a party, and Kane later offered him a job ghost writing the strips Rusty and Clip Carson. He recalled that Kane

Finger said he offered such suggestions as giving the character a cowl and scalloped cape instead of wings; adding gloves; leaving the mask's eyeholes blank to connote mystery; and removing the bright red sections of the original costume, suggesting instead a gray-and-black color scheme. Finger additionally said his suggestions were influenced by Lee Falk's The Phantom, a syndicated newspaper comic strip character with which Kane was familiar as well. Finger, who said he also devised the character's civilian name, Bruce Wayne, wrote the first Batman story, while Kane provided art. Kane, who had already submitted the proposal for Batman at DC and held a contract, is the only person given an official company credit for Batman's creation. Comics historian Ron Goulart, in Comic Book Encyclopedia, refers to Batman as the "creation of artist Bob Kane and writer Bill Finger".

According to Kane, "Bill Finger was a contributing force on Batman right from the beginning. He wrote most of the great stories and was influential in setting the style and genre other writers would emulate ... I made Batman a superhero-vigilante when I first created him. Bill turned him into a scientific detective.

The character debuted in Detective Comics #27 (May 1939) and proved a breakout hit. Within a year, Kane hired art assistants Jerry Robinson (initially as an inker) and George Roussos (backgrounds artist and letterer). Though Robinson and Roussos worked out of Kane's art studio in The New York Times building, Kane himself did all his drawing at home. Shortly afterward, when DC wanted more Batman stories than Kane's studio could deliver, the company assigned Dick Sprang and other in-house pencilers as "ghost artists", drawing uncredited under Kane's supervision. Future Justice League writer Gardner Fox wrote some early scripts, including the two-part story "The Monk" that introduced some of The Batman's first "Bat-" equipment.

In 1943, Kane left the Batman comic books to focus on penciling the daily Batman newspaper comic strip. DC Comics artists ghosting the comic-book stories now included Jack Burnley and Win Mortimer, with Robinson moving up as penciler and Fred Ray contributing some covers. After the strip finished in 1946, Kane returned to the comic books but, unknown to DC, had hired his own personal ghosts, including Lew Schwartz and Sheldon Moldoff from 1953 to 1967.

Robin
Bill Finger recalled that

Kane, who had previously created a sidekick for Peter Pupp, proposed adding a boy named Mercury who would have worn a "super-costume". Robinson suggested a normal human, along with the name "Robin", after Robin Hood books he had read during boyhood, and noting in a 2005 interview he had been inspired by one book's N. C. Wyeth illustrations.

 The new character, an orphaned circus performer named Dick Grayson, came to live with Bruce Wayne as his young ward in Detective Comics #38 (April 1940) and would inspire many similar sidekicks throughout the Golden Age of comic books.

The Joker
Batman's nemesis the Joker was introduced near that same time, in Batman #1 (Spring 1940). Credit for that character's creation is disputed. Kane's position is that

Robinson, whose original Joker playing card was on public display in the exhibition "Masters of American Comics" at the Jewish Museum in New York City, New York, from September 16, 2006 to January 28, 2007, and the William Breman Jewish Heritage Museum in Atlanta, Georgia from October 24, 2004 to August 28, 2005, has countered that:

Robinson added, however, "If you read the Batman historian [E. Nelson] Bridwell, he had one interview where he interviewed Bill Finger and he said no, the Joker was created by me—an acknowledgement. He can be credited and Bob himself, we all played a role in it. ... He wrote the script of that, so he really was co-creator, and Bob and I did the visuals, so Bob was also."

Other characters
According to comics historian Les Daniels, "nearly everyone seems to agree that Two-Face was Kane's brainchild exclusively". Catwoman, originally introduced by Kane with no costume as "the Cat", was partially inspired by his cousin, Ruth Steel. Kane, a frequent moviegoer, mentioned that Jean Harlow was a model for the design and added that "I always felt that women were feline". Kane created the Scarecrow and drew his first appearance, which was scripted by Finger. Kane also created the original incarnation of Clayface. According to Kane, he drew the Penguin after being inspired by the then advertising mascot of Kool cigarettes—a penguin with a top hat and cane. Finger, however, claimed that he created the villain as a caricature of the aristocratic type, because "stuffy English gentlemen" reminded him of emperor penguins.

Later life and career

In 1966, Kane retired from DC Comics, choosing to focus on fine art. As Kane's comic-book work tapered off in the 1960s, he parlayed his Batman status into minor celebrity. He enjoyed a post-comics career in television animation, creating the characters Courageous Cat and Cool McCool, and as a painter showed his work in art galleries, although some of these paintings were produced by ghost artists. DC Comics named Kane in 1985 as one of the honorees in the company's 50th anniversary publication Fifty Who Made DC Great. In 1989, Kane published the autobiography Batman and Me, with an updated edition Batman and Me: The Saga Continues, in 1996.

Kane worked as a consultant on the 1989 film Batman and its three sequels with directors Tim Burton and Joel Schumacher.

Stan Lee interviewed Kane in the documentary series The Comic Book Greats.

Personal life
Kane married his first wife, Beverly, in the 1940s, and the two divorced in 1957. They had a daughter, Deborah. Kane married his second wife, actress Elizabeth Sanders Kane, in 1987.

Kane died November 3, 1998, at Cedars-Sinai Medical Center in Los Angeles, at age 83. He is buried at Forest Lawn Memorial Park in the Hollywood Hills of Los Angeles, California.

Awards and honors
Kane was a recipient of the Inkpot Award in 1977, was inducted into the Jack Kirby Hall of Fame in 1994 and the Will Eisner Comic Book Hall of Fame in 1996. He was added to the National Comics Awards' Roll of Honour in 1999.

On October 21, 2015, for his work in motion pictures, he posthumously received a star on the Hollywood Walk of Fame, at 6764 Hollywood Boulevard.

Kane's work is housed in collections in New York City's Museum of Modern Art, Whitney Museum of American Art, and St. John's University.

References

Further reading
 Goulart, Ron, Over 50 Years of American Comic Books (BDD Promotional Books Company, 1991), ;

External links

 
 Comic Book Artist #3 (Winter 1999): "The Bob Kane Letter" (September 14, 1965 open letter by Bob Kane)

1915 births
1998 deaths
20th-century American artists
20th-century American writers
American autobiographers
American comics artists
American comics writers
American people of Eastern European descent
Artists from New York City
Batman
Burials at Forest Lawn Memorial Park (Hollywood Hills)
Cooper Union alumni
DeWitt Clinton High School alumni
Golden Age comics creators
People involved in plagiarism controversies
Inkpot Award winners
Jewish American artists
Jewish American writers
Will Eisner Award Hall of Fame inductees
Writers from New York City
DC Comics people
Fleischer Studios people